Malik Khuda Bakhsh Bucha was a former agriculture minister of Pakistan. He served in the cabinet of Ayub Khan, he died in March 2002 at the age of 97 .He was the leader of House west Pakistan Assembly from 1966 to 1968.(the leader of the house means like chief minister of west Pakistan).

References

Pakistani politicians
2002 deaths
Year of birth missing
Federal ministers of Pakistan